William Higgins (April 2, 1942 - January 21, 2022) was an American former professional tennis player.

Higgins, an Oklahoma native, was active on tour in the 1960s and 1970s, twice reaching the singles third round of the US Open. He recorded a top singles ranking of No. 115 in the world.

He died at his home in Florida on January 21, 2022, after a short illness.

References

External links
 
 

1942 births
2022 deaths
American male tennis players
Tennis people from Oklahoma
People from Lawton, Oklahoma